

Events

January
4 January – The Foreign Office warns British nationals against all but essential travel to Iran and Iraq, following a US airstrike in Baghdad the previous day in which Iranian general Qasem Soleimani was killed.
5 January – Boris Johnson says "we will not lament" Qasem Soleimani's death as he calls for "de-escalation from all sides".
6 January – Downing Street states that Britain will not support U.S. President Donald Trump's threat to bomb Iranian cultural and heritage sites.
7 January – The Labour Party leadership election formally begins, with the new leader scheduled to be announced on 4 April.
8 January – Prince Harry and Meghan, the Duke and Duchess of Sussex, announce that they plan to "step back as senior members" of Britain's royal family, and divide their time between the UK and North America.
9 January 
The UK and Irish governments publish a deal aimed at restoring the Northern Ireland Executive; the Democratic Unionist Party gives its backing to the agreement.
The House of Commons gives its third and final backing to the Withdrawal Agreement Bill, voting 330 to 231 in favour; the bill now passes to the House of Lords for scrutiny.
10 January – Sinn Féin gives its backing to a deal to restore power-sharing government to Northern Ireland for the first time since 2017.
11 January
The Northern Ireland Assembly reconvenes after a three-year hiatus; DUP leader Arlene Foster is appointed Northern Ireland's first minister, while Sinn Féin's Michelle O'Neill is appointed deputy first minister.
Robert Macaire, the British ambassador to Iran, is detained in Iran after attending a vigil for those killed on Ukraine International Airlines Flight 752. He is summoned to appear at Iran's foreign ministry the following day, for being "an unknown foreigner in an illegal gathering".
22 January – Boris Johnson's EU withdrawal deal successfully completes its passage through parliament, with the EU Withdrawal Agreement Bill being voted through without change, after several amendments proposed by the House of Lords are rejected.
23 January – 
Parliamentary ratification of Boris Johnson's EU withdrawal deal is completed with Royal Assent being given to the EU Withdrawal Agreement Bill.
Prince Charles ignores and walks past U.S. Vice President Mike Pence without shaking his hand at the World Holocaust Forum in Jerusalem.
31 January
The United Kingdom and Gibraltar leave the European Union, beginning an 11-month transition period, during which they remain in the Single Market and Customs Union.
The BBC and ITV main news bulletins choose not to broadcast in its entirety a three-minute speech recorded by Prime Minister Boris Johnson scheduled for 10pm, an hour before Brexit.

February
4 February – In London, Prime Minister Boris Johnson, naturalist Sir David Attenborough, and Italian Prime Minister Giuseppe Conte launch the 26th session of the Conference of the Parties (COP26), a major UN climate summit to be held in Glasgow in November 2020. Johnson announces, subject to consultation, that coal power could be phased out by 2024, a year earlier than previously planned and the phase-out of new petrol and diesel vehicles could be brought forward from 2040 to 2035. He also reaffirms the UK's commitment to reaching net zero carbon by 2050.
7 February – Buckingham Palace announces that the wedding of Princess Beatrice and Edoardo Mapelli Mozzi will take place on 29 May.
10 February – In a "historic" decision, councillors reject a proposed expansion of Bristol Airport, by 18 votes to seven, on the grounds that it would exacerbate climate change, damage the health of local people, and harm flora and fauna.
11 February – 
In the wake of the Streatham stabbing, the Terrorist Offenders Bill, designed to end the early release of prisoners convicted of terrorist offences, is presented to parliament.
Following a review of the project, Prime Minister Boris Johnson announces that the controversial high-speed rail link HS2 will be built.
12 February – 
The Terrorist Offenders Bill passes unopposed through the House of Commons to complete the first stage of the process to becoming law.
The government announces plans to extend the remit of the media regulator Ofcom to include internet and social media content in the UK.
13 February –
Boris Johnson carries out a cabinet reshuffle.
Sajid Javid resigns as Chancellor of the Exchequer. He is succeeded by Rishi Sunak.
17 February – Business and Energy Secretary and COP26 President Alok Sharma announces £1.2 billion in funding for a new supercomputer to improve weather and climate models in the UK.
27 February – Count Binface announces he will run for Mayor of London.
29 February – The Home Office's top civil servant, Sir Philip Rutnam, resigns and says he plans to claim constructive dismissal by the government following a series of clashes with the Home Secretary, Priti Patel.

March
2 March – The government holds a COBRA meeting to discuss its preparations and response to the coronavirus, as the number of UK cases jumps to 36.
3 March – The government publishes its action plan for dealing with coronavirus. This includes scenarios ranging from a milder pandemic to a "severe prolonged pandemic as experienced in 1918" and warns that a fifth of the national workforce could be absent from work during the infection's peak.
6 March – The Prime Minister announces £46 million in funding for research into a coronavirus vaccine and rapid diagnostic tests. During a visit to a laboratory in Bedfordshire, he says: "It looks like there will be a substantial period of disruption where we have to deal with this outbreak."
11 March – Chancellor of the Exchequer, Rishi Sunak, presents the Johnson Government's first budget, which includes £30 billion in measures to protect the economy from coronavirus.
13 March – Elections including the English local elections, London mayoral election and police and crime commissioner elections, scheduled for May 2020, are postponed for a year because of the coronavirus.
14 March – Vice President of the United States, Mike Pence, announces the US is to extend its European coronavirus travel ban to include the UK from 16 March.
15 March 
The Foreign Office advises against "all but essential travel" to the US.
Health Secretary Matt Hancock says that every UK resident over the age of 70 will be told "within the coming weeks" to self-isolate for "a very long time" to shield them from coronavirus.
The government announces plans to hold daily televised press conferences to update the public on the fight against the coronavirus pandemic, starting on Monday 16 March.
16 March – Prime Minister Boris Johnson advises everyone in the UK against "non-essential" travel and contact with others to curb coronavirus, as well as suggesting people should avoid pubs, clubs and theatres, and work from home if possible. Pregnant women, people over the age of 70 and those with certain health conditions are urged to consider the advice "particularly important", and will be asked to self-isolate within days.
17 March – The Chancellor, Rishi Sunak, announces that £330bn will be made available in loan guarantees for businesses affected by the coronavirus.
18 March
The government announces that all schools in the country will shut from the afternoon of Friday 20 March, except for those looking after the children of keyworkers and vulnerable children. No exams will take place this academic year, Education Secretary Gavin Williamson confirms.
The government announces emergency legislation to bring in a complete ban on new evictions for three months as part of measures to help protect renters in social and private rented accommodation.
20 March
Chancellor Rishi Sunak announces that the government will pay 80% of wages for employees not working, up to £2,500 a month, as part of "unprecedented" measures to protect people's jobs.
Prime Minister Boris Johnson orders all cafes, pubs and restaurants to close from the evening of 20 March, except for take-away food, to tackle coronavirus. All the UK's nightclubs, theatres, cinemas, gyms and leisure centres are told to close "as soon as they reasonably can".
21 March – Environment Secretary George Eustice urges shoppers to stop panic buying, as supermarkets around the UK struggle to keep up with demand. Tesco, Asda, Aldi, and Lidl are reported to have begun a recruitment drive for up to 30,000 new staff.
22 March –Boris Johnson warns that "tougher measures" may be introduced if people do not follow government advice on social distancing.
23 March
The government announces emergency measures to safeguard the nation's rail network, with season ticket holders given refunds if working from home, and rail franchise agreements nationalised for at least six months to prevent rail companies from collapsing.
Alex Salmond is cleared of sexually assaulting nine women while he was Scotland's First Minister.
In a televised address, Boris Johnson announces a UK-wide lockdown with immediate effect, to contain the spread of the coronavirus. People can leave their homes only for "very limited purposes" – shopping for basic necessities; for one form of exercise a day; for any medical need; and to travel to and from work when "absolutely necessary". A number of other restrictions are imposed, with police given powers to enforce the measures, including the use of fines.
24 March – Health secretary Matt Hancock announces the government will open a temporary hospital, the NHS Nightingale Hospital London at the Excel London, to add extra critical care capacity in response to coronavirus pandemic.
25 March – Parliament shuts down for a month.
26 March – The government announces that the self-employed will be paid 80% of profits, up to £2,500 a month, to help them cope during the economic crisis triggered by COVID-19.
27 March
Prime Minister Boris Johnson tests positive for COVID-19, and will self-isolate in 10 Downing Street.
Health Secretary Matt Hancock tests positive for COVID-19 and reports that he is working from home and self-isolating.

April
4 April – Sir Keir Starmer is confirmed as the new leader of the Labour Party, succeeding Jeremy Corbyn.
5 April – Prime Minister Boris Johnson is admitted to hospital for tests after testing positive for coronavirus ten days earlier.
6 April – Prime Minister Boris Johnson is taken into intensive care after being admitted to hospital for coronavirus the day before. It is announced that First Secretary of State Dominic Raab will deputise for him.
9 April
Foreign Secretary Dominic Raab says the UK is "starting to see the impact" of the restrictions but that it is "too early" to lift them, and urges people to stay indoors over the Easter weekend.
Prime Minister Boris Johnson is moved out of intensive care, but remains in hospital.
12 April – Prime Minister Boris Johnson is discharged from hospital after being treated for coronavirus and will continue his recovery at Chequers.
16 April – Foreign Secretary Dominic Raab announces a three-week extension to the nationwide lockdown measures as the number of confirmed COVID-19 cases in the UK surpasses 100,000.
19 April – Michael Gove, in a BBC interview with Andrew Marr, concedes that the Prime Minister missed five COBRA meetings in the early stages of the viral outbreak, and that the UK shipped protective equipment to China in February.
22 April – MPs take part in the first "virtual" Prime Minister's Questions, via video conferencing service Zoom.
27 April – Boris Johnson returns to work after three weeks of illness. In his first speech outside 10 Downing Street since recovering from coronavirus, he urges the public not to lose patience with the lockdown, warning that the UK is at the moment of "maximum risk".
28 April – The Scottish government recommends that people cover their faces in certain enclosed public spaces like shops and public transport: UK ministers are considering the issue
29 April – Boris Johnson's Fiancée, Carrie Symonds gives birth to a son.

July 

 8 July - The Chancellor of the Exchequer, Rishi Sunak holds the July 2020 United Kingdom summer statement, also known as the Coronavirus mini-budget. It includes announcements that the Furlough scheme will be wound down gradually until finishing in October, the threshold for Stamp duty will be raised until the 31st March 2021 and a ‘plans for jobs’ package worth £30 billion will be implemented, as well as the ‘Eat Out to Help Out’ scheme, VAT cuts for the hospitality sector and over £6 billion in Green investment.

August 

 3 August - The Government's Eat Out to Help Out Scheme begins as previously announced by the Chancellor of the Exchequer, Rishi Sunak in the July 2020 United Kingdom summer statement, and runs from the 3rd August till the 31st of August.

September 

 28 September – Newcomer MP Claudia Webbe is suspended from the Labour Party after being charged with harassment.

October 

 29 October – Jeremy Corbyn is suspended from the Labour Party.

November 

 17 November – Jeremy Corbyn is readmitted to the Labour Party.

December 

 17 December - The Chancellor of the Exchequer, Rishi Sunak, announces that the furlough and loan schemes have been extended until the end of April 2021.
 18 December – Joe FitzPatrick is sacked as Scottish Minister for Public Health, Sport and Wellbeing after drug-related deaths in Scotland rose for a sixth year.
18 December – Conservative MP Andrew Lewer is sacked as a ministerial aide.
19 December - The Government reverses the decision to loosen COVID-19 indoor mixing restrictions over Christmas, reducing it to only Christmas Day for England, Scotland and Wales. It also announces a new Tier 4 restriction level for areas in London and the South East already in Tier 3. Those in the new Tier 4 restriction are not able to mix over Christmas at all.
20 December - Many EU countries including France close their borders to the United Kingdom due to the new strain of COVID-19 spreading rapidly in London and the South East of England. The Port of Dover halts all exports to France due to this.
23 December - France reopens its borders to the United Kingdom, providing those who come through the border have a negative COVID-19 test.

Predicted and scheduled events

March 

 31 March – Fax machines are planned to be completely phased out of use in England's NHS by this date.

April 
 1 April – Plastic drinking straws, cotton buds and drink stirrers are due to be banned in England.

May 

 15 May – Plastic-stemmed cotton buds are expected to be banned in Scotland.

June
Unknown – The BBC's ending of free television licences for over-75s is due to come into force.

December 

 31 December – Brexit transition period ends.

History by issue
Note: this section is for describing issues in narrative format if desired.

Brexit

In January 2020, The United Kingdom and Gibraltar left the European Union, beginning an 11-month transition period, during which they remain in the Single Market and Customs Union.

Climate change
In December 2019, the World Meteorological Organization released its annual climate report revealing that climate impacts are worsening. They found the global sea temperatures are rising as well as land temperatures worldwide. 2019 is the last year in a decade that is the warmest on record.

Global carbon emissions hit a record high in 2019, even though the rate of increase slowed somewhat, according to a report from Global Carbon Project.

See also

General politics timelines by year
 2020 in politics and government 
Other UK timelines by year
 2020 in the United Kingdom
Decade articles
 2010s in political history
 2010s in United Kingdom political history
 Other country timelines
 2020 in United States politics and government
 Draft articles:
2020s in United Kingdom political history

Specific situations and issues
 Brexit negotiations
 Brexit negotiations in 2019
 Premiership of Boris Johnson

References 

 
Political timelines of the 2020s by year
United Kingdom politics and government
Political timelines of the United Kingdom